The Tristate Concert Association organizes concerts throughout the year in the greater Cumberland, Maryland region.  The concert venue is a tribute to music from the golden age of rock-n-roll, swing, and big-band; as well as popular country and chorial music.

Previous Performances have included:

 09/2002 - The Platters
 10/2002 - Jimmy Dorsey & The Pied Pipers
 10/2002 - Harry James
 11/2002 - Mills Brothers
 12/2002 - Holiday Special
 03/2003 -  Les Brown
 04/2003 - Gail Bliss - Tribute to Patsy Cline
 05/2003 - Sammy Kaye
 06/2003 - The Four Lads
 09/2004 - The Crystals
 09/2004 - Martha and the Vandellas
 10/2004 - Gary Lewis & the Playboys
 10/2004 - Lou Christie
 01/2005 - Bobby Vee
 01/2005 - Diamond David Somerville
 02/2005 - Beary Hobb's  Drifters
 02/2005 - Cornell Gunter  Coasters
 03/2005 - The Waller Family
 04/2005 - Matt Lewis
 04/2005 - A Tribute to Elvis
 04/2005 - The Jordanaires
 09/2005 - The Happenings
 09/2005 - Shirley Alston-Reeves
 09/2005 - The Del-Vikings
 10/2005 - Johnny Maestro & the Brooklyn Bridge
 10/2005 - Chinese Bandits
 ??/2006 - <fill in missing info here>
 1/2007  - The Lettermen 
 2/2007  - The Wallers 
 3/2007  - Bobby Vinton
 4/2007  -  Bill Haley's Comets ("Rock Around the Clock" fame)  /  The Del-Vikings
 9/2007  - Matt Lewis' Tribute to Elvis with the Chinese Bandits 
 10/2007 - Beary Hobbs'  Drifters and The Platters

External links
 Tri State Concert Series

Concerts in the United States
Festivals in Cumberland, MD-WV-PA